Xanthomorda is a genus of beetles in the family Mordellidae, containing the following species:

 Xanthomorda aequalis Batten, 1990
 Xanthomorda cooteri Batten, 1990
 Xanthomorda elegantissima Batten, 1990
 Xanthomorda garambaensis Ermisch, 1969
 Xanthomorda guineensis Ermisch, 1969
 Xanthomorda paarlbergi Batten, 1990
 Xanthomorda papuanica Batten, 1990
 Xanthomorda plazae Batten, 1990

References

Mordellidae